HMS Musquito may refer to a gunboat built by the British near a fort in present-day Michigan in 1777. This vessel was later captured at the Battle of Point Coupe by a group of George Rogers Clark's men of the Virginia State Line, then sold by the Virginia assembly to the Continental Navy in late 1779 for use on the Ohio and Mississippi rivers.

References

Ships of the Royal Navy
Sailing ships of the United Kingdom
American Revolution
1777 ships